Patriarch Euthymius may refer to:

Patriarch Euthymius I of Constantinople (834–917)
Patriarch Euthymius II of Constantinople (c. 1340–1416)
Patriarch Evtimiy of Bulgaria (Euthymius of Tarnovo) (1325–1402)
Euthymius II Karmah, 17th-century Melkite Patriarch of Antioch 
Euthymius III of Chios, 17th-century Melkite Patriarch of Antioch